Women's 100m races for wheelchair athletes at the 2004 Summer Paralympics were held in the Athens Olympic Stadium. Events were held in two disability classes.

T53

The T53 event consisted of a single race. It was won by Tanni Grey-Thompson OBE, representing .

Final Round
23 Sept. 2004, 21:20

T54

The T54 event consisted of 2 heats and a final. It was won by Chantal Petitclerc, representing .

1st Round

Heat 1
20 Sept. 2004, 10:25

Heat 2
20 Sept. 2004, 10:31

Final Round
21 Sept. 2004, 17:30

References

W
2004 in women's athletics